

Franz Scheidies (22  December 1890 – 7 April 1942) was a general in the Wehrmacht of Nazi Germany during the Second World War and a recipient of the Knight's Cross of the Iron Cross with Oak Leaves. Scheidis was killed by a Soviet sniper on 7 April 1942.

Awards
 Clasp to the Iron Cross (1939) 2nd Class (19 September 1939) & 1st Class (3 October 1939)
 Knight's Cross of the Iron Cross with Oak Leaves
 Knight's Cross on 5 August 1940 as Oberstleutnant and commander of Festungs-Infanterie-Regiment "C" (Divisions Stab z.b.V. 444)
 43rd Oak Leaves on 31 December 1941 as Oberst and commander of Infanterie-Regiment 22

References

Citations

Bibliography

 
 

1890 births
1942 deaths
Major generals of the German Army (Wehrmacht)
Recipients of the Knight's Cross of the Iron Cross with Oak Leaves
People from Tilsit
German Army personnel killed in World War II
Deaths by firearm in the Soviet Union
German Army generals of World War II